The golden-belted bent-toed gecko (Cyrtodactylus auribalteatus) is a species of gecko endemic to Thailand.

References

Cyrtodactylus
Reptiles described in 2010